A butane torch is a tool which creates an intensely hot flame using a fuel mixture of LPGs typically including some percentage of butane, a flammable gas.

This temperature is high enough to melt many common metals, such as aluminum and copper, and hot enough to vaporize many organic compounds as well.

Applications

Brazing, soldering, plumbing
Often used as daily task tools, butane torches work very well for home improvement and work to solve problems with plumbing, soldering and brazing. Most of the times copper, silver and other metals are used for home repairs of tubes and other house things.

Culinary

Butane torches are frequently employed as kitchen gadgets to caramelize sugar in cooking, such as when making crème brûlée.  They may be marketed as kitchen torches, cooking torches, or culinary torches.  Use of the butane torch in the kitchen is not limited to caramelizing sugar; it can be used to melt or brown toppings on casseroles or soups, to melt cheese, and to roast or char vegetables such as peppers.

Cigars
Pocket butane torches are commonly used as lighters for cigars, capitalizing on the intensity of the flame to light quickly and evenly the large, relatively damp, burning surface of a cigar.

Bartender 
Many bartenders and mixologists use butane torches in their recipes. Smoked and flaming cocktails are now a trend.

Drug use
Butane torches are sometimes used in vaporizing cocaine free base (crack), black tar heroin, methamphetamine or hash oil for inhalation.

See also 
 Propane torch
 Lighter
 Blow torch
 List of cooking appliances
 Oxy-fuel welding and cutting

References 

Burners
Cooking appliances
Tools
torch